Flaming Starr is an album by Maurice Starr. It was released in 1980.

Critical reception
AllMusic wrote that "when Starr really turns up the funk and emphasizes keyboards and synthesizers, Flaming Starr predicts the synth-funk/electro-hop era; that is especially true on "Moving on Up" and the infectious "Dance to the Funky Groove"." The Boston Globe declared that "Side 1 ... contains almost no excess - its songs make their point, grab a place in the listener's memory, and end."

Track listing
All tracks composed, arranged and produced by Maurice Starr and Michael Jonzun

References

External links

1980 debut albums
Albums produced by Maurice Starr
RCA Records albums